Tribeni railway station is railway station on Bandel–Katwa line connecting from  ( from Bandel) to Katwa, and under the jurisdiction of Howrah railway division ( from hwh) of Eastern Railway zone. It is situated at Station Road, Masterpara, Tribeni, Hooghly district in the Indian state of West Bengal.

History 
The Hooghly–Katwa Railway constructed a line from Bandel to Katwa in 1913. This line including Tribeni railway station was electrified in 1994–96 with 25 kV overhead line.

References 

Railway stations in Hooghly district
Kolkata Suburban Railway stations
Howrah railway division